Estadio Dorados  is a stadium with a capacity of 21,000 seats. Is home of the team Dorados de Sinaloa. The stadium was inaugurated on August 9, 2003 in a match played between Dorados de Sinaloa and Cobras de Ciudad Juárez. The final score was Dorados 4-2 Cobras. The first goal scored in this stage was the work of Hector Giménez. The building has a capacity for 20,108 fans, the same that is constructed in 2003 in record time of just three months.

Events
2007 CONCACAF U20 Tournament, Primera División A, Primera División, Concerts

References

See also
List of football stadiums in Mexico

Sports venues in Sinaloa
Banorte